The economy of Punjab is the 16th largest state economy in India with  (FY2020-21) in gross domestic product and a per capita GDP of US$2360(180,000) ranking 19th amongst Indian states. Punjab ranked first in GDP per capita amongst Indian states in 1981 and fourth in 2001, but has experienced slower growth than the rest of India in recent years, having the second-slowest GDP per capita growth rate of all Indian states and UTs between 2000 and 2010, behind only Manipur. Between 1992 and 2014, Punjab's life expectancy also grew slower than most Indian states; while rising from 69.4 to 71.4 years, Punjab's rank amongst Indian states in life expectancy at birth fell from first to sixth.

The state's economy is mainly dominated by agricultural production and small and medium-sized enterprises. Punjab has the ninth highest ranking among Indian states and union territories in human development index as of 2018.

History 

Punjab ranked first in GDP per capita amongst Indian states in 1981 and fourth in 2001, but has experienced slower growth than the rest of India, having the second-slowest GDP per capita growth rate of all Indian states and UTs between 2000 and 2010, behind only Manipur.

Ancient and medieval eras

Indus Valley Civilisation 

The citizens of the Indus Valley civilisation, a permanent settlement that flourished between 2800 BC and 1800 BC, practised agriculture, domesticated animals, used uniform weights and measures, made tools and weapons, and traded with other cities. Evidence of well-planned streets, a drainage system and water supply reveals their knowledge of urban planning, which included the first-known urban sanitation systems and the existence of a form of municipal government.

Mahajanapadas

Silver punch-marked coins were minted as currency belonging to a period of intensive trade activity and urban development by the Mahajanapadas.

Silk Route 

Scholars suggest trading from India to West Asia and Eastern Europe was active between the 14th and 18th centuries. Most overland trade was carried out via the Khyber Pass connecting the Punjab region with Afghanistan and onward to the Middle East and Central Asia.

Medieval period
Although many kingdoms and rulers issued coins, barter was prevalent. Villages paid a portion of their agricultural produce as revenue to the rulers, while their craftsmen received a part of the crops at harvest time for their services.

Mughal era (1526–1738) 

The Mughal Empire ruled over Punjab from 1526 to 1738 and controlled its economy during that time period, implementing Islamic economics. It was under Mughal rule that barter became rare in Punjab and a monetary system was fully established.

Sikh era (1738–1849)

Sikh Confederacy (1738–1799)

The decline of the Mughal Empire left a power vacuum in the Punjab, which resulted in constant conflict in Punjab until the formation of the Sikh Empire. The conflict severely damaged the economy.

Sikh Empire (1799–1849)

Maharaja Ranjit Singh ensured that Punjab manufactured and was self-sufficient in all weapons, equipment and munitions his army needed. His government invested in infrastructure in the 1800s and thereafter, established raw materials mines, cannon foundries, gunpowder and arm factories. Some of these operations were owned by the state, others operated by private Sikh operatives.

However, Ranjit Singh did not make major investments in other infrastructure such as irrigation canals to improve the productivity of land and roads. The prosperity in his empire, in contrast to the Mughal-Sikh Wars era, largely came from the improvement in the security situation, reduction in violence, reopened trade routes and greater freedom to conduct commerce.

Under the Sikh rule, the Nanakshahi rupee (issued by the Sikhs and named after Guru Nanak, the founder of Sikhism) was the predominant currency.

British era (1849–1947)

Agriculture
In 1885 the Punjab administration began an ambitious plan to transform over six million acres of barren waste land in central and western Punjab into irrigable agricultural land. The creation of canal colonies was designed to relieve demographic pressures in the central parts of the province, increase productivity and revenues, and create a loyal support amongst peasant landholders. The colonisation resulted in an agricultural revolution in the province, rapid industrial growth, and the resettlement of over one million Punjabis in the new areas. A number of towns were created or saw significant development in the colonies, such as Lyallpur, Sargodha and Montgomery. Colonisation led to the canal irrigated area of the Punjab increasing from three to fourteen million acres in the period from 1885 to 1947.
Within a few years of its annexation, the Punjab was regarded as British India's model agricultural province. From the 1860s onwards, agricultural prices and land values soared in the Punjab. This stemmed from increasing political security and improvements in infrastructure and communications. New cash crops such as wheat, tobacco, sugar cane and cotton were introduced. By 1920s the Punjab produced a tenth of India's total cotton crop and a third of its wheat crop. Per capita output of all the crops in the province increased by approximately 45 percent between 1891 and 1921, a growth contrasting to agricultural crises in Bengal, Bihar and Orissa during the period.

An agricultural college was also established in British India, now known as University of Agriculture Faisalabad. Rapid agricultural growth, combined with access to easy credit for landowners, led to a growing crisis of indebtedness.  When landowners were unable to pay down their loans, urban based moneylenders took advantage of the law to foreclose debts of mortgaged land.  This led to a situation where land increasingly passed to absentee moneylenders who had little connection to the villages were the land was located. The colonial government recognised this as a potential threat to the stability of the province, and a split emerged in the government between paternalists who favoured intervention to ensure order, and those who opposed state intervention in private property relations. The paternalists emerged victorious and the Punjab Land Alienation Act, 1900 prevented urban commercial castes, who were overwhelmingly Hindu, from permanently acquiring land from statutory agriculturalist tribes, who were mainly Muslim and Sikh. Accompanied by the increasing franchise of the rural population, this interventionist approach led to a long lasting impact on the political landscape of the province. The agricultural lobby remained loyal to the government, and rejected communalism in common defence of its privileges against urban moneylenders. This position was entrenched by the Unionist Party. The Congress Party's opposition to the Act led to it being marginalised in the Punjab, reducing its influence more so than in any other province, and inhibiting its ability to challenge colonial rule locally. The political dominance of the Unionist Party would remain until partition, and significantly it was only on the collapse of its power on the eve of independence from Britain, that communal violence began to spread in rural Punjab.

Army

In 1914, three fifths of the Indian army came from the Punjab, despite the region constituting approximately one tenth of the total population of British India.  During the First World War, Punjabi Sikhs alone accounted for one quarter of all armed personnel in India. Military service provided access to the wider world, and personnel were deployed across the British Empire from Malaya, the Mediterranean and Africa. Upon completion of their terms of service, these personnel were often amongst the first to seek their fortunes abroad. At the outbreak of the Second World War, 48 percent of the Indian army came from the province. In Jhelum, Rawalpindi and Attock, the percentage of the total male population who enlisted reached fifteen percent. The Punjab continued to be the main supplier of troops throughout the war, contributing 36 percent of the total Indian troops who served in the conflict.

The huge proportion of Punjabis in the army meant that a significant amount of military expenditure went to Punjabis and in turn resulted in an abnormally high level of resource input in the Punjab. It has been suggested that by 1935 if remittances of serving officers were combined with income from military pensions, more than two thirds of Punjab's land revenue could have been paid out of military incomes. Military service further helped reduce the extent of indebtedness across the Province. In Hoshiarpur, a notable source of military personnel, in 1920 thirty percent of proprietors were debt free compared to the region's average of eleven percent. In addition, the benefits of military service and the perception that the government was benevolent towards soldiers, affected the latter's attitudes towards the British. The loyalty of recruited peasantry and the influence of military groups in rural areas across the province limited the reach of the nationalist movement in the province.

Green Revolution period (1947–1991) 

The Green Revolution in India was first introduced in Punjab in the late 1960s as part of a development program issued by international donor agencies and the Government of India.

Since 1965, the use of high-yielding varieties of seeds, increased fertilisers and improved irrigation facilities collectively contributed to the Green Revolution in India, which improved the condition of agriculture by increasing crop productivity, improving crop patterns and strengthening forward and backward linkages between agriculture and industry. This was focused in Punjab, and greatly improved the states economy, especially in comparison to the rest of India, which saw a low rate of growth. By 1981, Punjab's GDP per capita had become the highest amongst Indian states and union territories.

The Green Revolution yielded great economic prosperity during its early years. In Punjab, where it was first introduced, the Green Revolution led to significant increases in the state's agricultural output, supporting India's overall economy. By 1970, Punjab was producing 70% of the country's total food grains, and farmers' incomes were increasing by over 70%. Punjab's prosperity following the Green Revolution became a model to which other states aspired to reach.

Punjab became the first Indian state to provide electricity to all of its villages in 1974, after the completion of the Guru Nanak Thermal Plant in Bathinda.

Criticism 
However, despite the initial prosperity experienced in Punjab, the Green Revolution was met with much controversy.

Punjabi economic sovereignty 
Criticism on the effects of the green revolution include the cost for many small farmers using HYV seeds, with their associated demands of increased irrigation systems and pesticides. A case study is found in Punjab, where farmers are buying Monsanto BT cotton seeds—sold on the idea that these seeds produced 'natural insecticides'. In reality, they need to still pay for expensive pesticides and irrigation systems, which might lead to increased borrowing to finance the change from traditional seed varieties. Many farmers have difficulty in paying for the expensive technologies, especially if they have a bad harvest. These high costs of cultivation push rural farmers to take out loans—typically at high interest rates. Over-borrowing commonly entraps farmers into a cycle of debt.

On top of this, India's liberalized economy further exacerbates the farmers's economic conditions. Indian environmentalist Vandana Shiva writes that this is the "second Green Revolution". The first Green Revolution, she suggests, was mostly publicly funded (by the Indian Government). This new Green Revolution, she says, is driven by private (and foreign) interest—notably MNCs like Monsanto—as encouraged by the neoliberal context. Ultimately, this is leading to foreign ownership over most of India's farmland, undermining farmers' interests.

Farmer's financial issues have become especially apparent in Punjab, where its rural areas have witnessed an alarming rise in suicide rates. Excluding the countless unreported cases, there has been estimated to be a 51.97% increase in the number of suicides in Punjab in 1992–93, compared to the recorded 5.11% increase in the country as a whole. According to a 2019 Indian news report, indebtedness continues to be a grave issue affecting Punjabi people today, demonstrated by the more than 900 recorded farmer committed suicide in Punjab in the last two years.

Environmental damage 
Excessive and inappropriate use of fertilizers and pesticides polluted waterways and killed beneficial insects and wildlife. It has caused over-use of soil and rapidly depleted its nutrients. The rampant irrigation practices led to eventual soil degradation caused by stubble burning. Groundwater practices have fallen dramatically. Further, heavy dependence on few major crops has led to loss of biodiversity of farmers. These problems were aggravated due to absence of training to use modern technology and vast illiteracy leading to excessive use of chemicals.

Increased regional disparities 
The green revolution spread only in irrigated and high-potential rainfed areas. The villages or regions without the access of sufficient water were left out that widened the regional disparities between adopters and non-adopters. Since, the HYV seeds technically can be applied only in a land with assured water supply and availability of other inputs like chemicals, fertilizers etc. The application of the new technology in the dry-land areas is simply ruled out.

Communal Tensions 
While the Green Revolution in Punjab had several positive and negative impacts, the introduction of the mechanised agricultural techniques led to uneven distribution of wealth. The industrial development was not done at the same pace of agricultural development, the Indian government had been reluctant to set up heavy industries in Punjab due to its status as a high-risk border state with Pakistan. The rapid increase in the higher education opportunities without adequate rise in the jobs resulted in the increase in the unemployment of educated youth.  The resulting unemployed rural Sikh youth were drawn to the militant groups, and formed the backbone of the militancy that occurred in Punjab during the 1980s.

Economic liberalisation period (since 1991) 

Economic liberalisation in India propelled India to become one of the fastest growing major economies in the world. However, Punjab has grown slower than the rest of India, and thus its GDP per capita rank has dropped from first amongst Indian states and union territories in 1981 to sixteenth in 2020.

Some argue that some of the slower growth might have been caused by high rates of corruption in the state government and mistreatment of the state by the central government. Low rates of investment and high rates of debt are some of the problems caused by the Green Revolution which also have helped keep growth lower in the state then elsewhere in India.

The slower growth of Punjab's economy, particularly the agricultural sector, is believed to have helped fuel the 2020–2021 Indian farmers' protest.

The economy of Punjab was severely effected by the COVID-19 pandemic in 2020.

Macroeconomic trend
The state government agency for collecting macroeconomic statistics is the Economic and Statistical Organisation Punjab (ESO).

According to the 2008 Global Hunger Index, Punjab has the lowest level of hunger in India. Less than one-fourth of children below the age of five are underweight. The state has also one of the lowest poverty rates in India at 8 percent in 2012. Punjab has also seen strong economic growth, but since 2005 the state's growth has fallen below India's national average.

Punjab's debt was estimated at 39.8% of the state's GDP in 2020, down from 62% of its GDP in 2005.

The chart shows the trend of Punjab's gross state domestic product of Punjab at market prices, as estimated by the Ministry of Statistics and Programme Implementation.

Agriculture 

Punjab's economy has been primarily agriculture-based since the Green Revolution due to the presence of abundant water sources and fertile soils; most of the state lies in a fertile alluvial plain with many rivers and an extensive irrigation canal system. Punjab makes up for about 17% of India's wheat production (second highest amongst Indian states and union territories after Uttar Pradesh, the latter producing more than 30% of the nation's supply), around 12% of its rice production, and around 5% of its milk production, being known as India's breadbasket.

The percentage of GDP produced by the agricultural sector was 25% in 2018–19. The growth rate of the agricultural sector was only 2.3% in 2018–19, compared to 6.0% for the state's economy as a whole.

Most of the state lies in a fertile alluvial plain with many rivers and an extensive irrigation canal system, and the region is ideal for growing grains, fruits, and vegetables. Despite covering only 1.53% of its geographical area, Punjab makes up for about 15–20% of India's wheat production, around 12% of its rice production, and around 10% of its milk production, being known as India's breadbasket.

About 80%-95% of Punjab's agricultural land is owned by its Jat Sikh community despite it only forming 21% of the state's population. About 10% of Punjab's population is made up of migrants from poorer states to the southeast such as Uttar Pradesh and Bihar who work as farm laborers.

The largest grown crop is wheat. Other important crops are rice, cotton, sugarcane, pearl millet, finger millet, sorghum, maize, barley and fruits. Among the fodder crops are bajra and jowar. In the category of fruits, it produces abundant stock of kinnow. The main sources of irrigation are canals and tube wells.

Rabi (spring) harvest
The rabi or the spring harvest consists of wheat, gram, barley, potatoes and winter vegetables.

Kharif (autumn) harvest
The kharif or the autumn harvest consists of rice, maize, sugarcane, cotton and pulses.

Pollution
Rice and wheat are doublecropped in Punjab with rice stalks being burned off over millions of acres prior to the planting of wheat. This widespread practice is polluting and wasteful.

In Punjab the consumption of fertiliser per hectare is 223.46 kg as compared to 90 kg nationally. In recent years a drop in productivity has been observed, mainly due to falling fertility of the soil. This is believed to be due to excessive use of fertilisers and pesticides over the years. Another worry is the rapidly falling water table on which almost 90% of the agriculture depends; alarming drops have been witnessed in recent years. By some estimates, groundwater is falling by a meter or more per year.

Issues
Issues include paddy-wheat monoculture, lack of diversification and warnings of desertification.

Industry 
The percentage of GDP produced by the manufacturing sector was 25% in 2018–19. The growth rate of the manufacturing sector was 5.8% in 2018–19, compared to 6.0% for the state's economy as a whole. A prominent feature of Punjab's industrial landscape are its small sized industrial units. There are nearly 194,000 small scale industrial units in the state in addition to 586 large and medium units. Ludhiana is an important center for industry.

Other major industries include the manufacturing of scientific instruments, agricultural goods, electrical goods, machine tools, textiles, sewing machines, sports goods, starch, fertilisers, bicycles, garments, and the processing of pine oil and sugar. Minerals and energy resources also contribute to Punjab's economy to a much lesser extent. Punjab has the largest number of steel rolling mill plants in India, which are in "Steel Town"—Mandi Gobindgarh in the Fatehgarh Sahib district.

The industrial units in the state are broadly divided into three important sectors:

 Agro-based industrial units
 Machinery units
 Chemical units

Textile industry 
The state produces nearly 25% of the best quality cotton in India. In spite of several advantages, there is one major disadvantage that the total spindlage capacity of the state is only 1.5% of the country. Ludhiana is known as manchester of India. Batala  was once called the "Iron bird of Asia" as it produced the highest amount of C.I. casting, agricultural and mechanical machinery. Batala is still one of the leading cities in Northern India in manufacturing of C.I. casting and mechanical machinery. Cotton ginning, weaving, sugar refining and rice milling are some of other important industries of the region.

The cotton mills are located at Abohar, Malout, Phagwara, Amritsar, Kharar, Mohali and Ludhiana. Malerkotla, Abohar, Malout and Bhatinda are important for cotton ginning and pressing nearly 25.3 million (25,300,000) bales of cotton. About 97 million kilograms of yarn and 36.5 million metres of cloth were produced in the cotton textile mills of Punjab. But only 43% of the cotton yarn formed in Punjab is used within the states and the remaining is sold outside the state. Pesticides introduced in the Green Revolution played an important part in the bustling cotton industry. The most common biopesticides in Punjab are Bacillus thuringiensis (Bt). With the introduction of Bt cotton, the total Punjab cotton area increased from 449,000 hectares in 2002 to 560,000 hectares in 2005. During this time frame, production of cotton has also increased: from 1.08 million bales (170 kg each) to 2.2 million bales, making up about 11–12% of the country's total production of cotton.

Overall textile production of Punjab is predictable at Rs.105000 Million, as well as Rs.32500 Million sell abroad of knitwear, shawls, made-ups (bed sheets, pillow cases, duvet covers, and curtains) and yarns. The direct and indirect employ of textile doings in the state of Punjab is predictable at 2 Million people.

Sugar industry 

The sugar mills in Punjab are located at Batala, Gurdaspur, Bhogpur, Phagwara, Nawanshahar, Zira, Morinda, Rakhra, Dhuri, Fazilka, Nakodar, Dasua, Budhewal, Budhladha, Mukerian, Tarn Taran, Ajnala, Faridkot, Jagraon, Amloh, Patran and Lauhka.
Butter Sivian Near Baba Bakala
One of the salient feature of the sugar industry is that out of the 22 mills, 15 are in the Co-operative sector and 7 are privately owned. Compared to the state of Uttar Pradesh and some other Indian states, the size of the sugar mills in Punjab is small. The Co-operative sugar mill at Morinda is the biggest in the state with a daily crushing capacity of 4,000 tonnes of sugarcane. Six of the cooperative sugar mills are inoperative while the remaining nine crush cane during the season.

Dairy industry 

The primary source of milk and other dairy products in the state is the buffalo. The state ranks at the top in the country in the availability of milk after Haryana and Gujarat.

The milk plants are mainly located at Verka Town (Amristar district), Ludhiana, Mohali, Jalandhar, Patiala, Hoshiarpur, Gurdaspur, Ferozepur, Sangrur, Bhatinda, Faridkot, Nabha, Moga, Kot Kapura and Hamira. The plant at Moga is the biggest plant in the state with a processing capacity of nearly 435 thousand litres. The first AMUL milk plant of Punjab state was opened in 2015 at Batala.

Services
The percentage of GDP produced by the services sector was 50% in 2018–19. The growth rate of the services sector was 7.1% in 2018–19, compared to 6.0% for the state's economy as a whole.

The state's bustling tourism, music, culinary, and film industries contribute to the state's economy, and are amongst the largest in India despite the state's small size and population, including India's largest music industry. Punjab also has a large diaspora that is mostly settled in the United Kingdom, the United States, and Canada, numbers about 3 million, and sends back billions of USD in remittances to the state, playing a major role in its economy.

Remittances
In 2012, the state was one of the highest receivers of overall remittances to India which stood at $66.13 billion, behind  Kerala and Tamil Nadu.

Tourism

Tourism in Indian Punjab centres around the historic palaces, battle sites, and the great Sikh architecture of the state and the surrounding region. Examples include various sites of the Indus Valley civilization, the ancient fort of Bathinda, the architectural monuments of Kapurthala, Patiala, and Chandigarh, the modern capital designed by Le Corbusier.

The Golden Temple in Amritsar is one of the major tourist destinations of Punjab and indeed India, attracting more visitors than the Taj Mahal. Lonely Planet Bluelist 2008 has voted the Harmandir Sahib as one of the world's best spiritual sites. Moreover, there is a rapidly expanding array of international hotels in the holy city at Heritage Walk Amritsar that can be booked for overnight stays. Devi Talab Mandir is a Hindu temple located in Jalandhar. This temple is devoted to Goddess Durga and is believed to be at least 200 years old. Another main tourist destination is religious and historic city of Sri Anandpur Sahib where large number of tourists come to see the Virasat-e-Khalsa (Khalsa Heritage Memorial Complex) and also take part in Hola Mohalla festival. Kila Raipur Sports Festival is also popular tourist attraction in Kila Raipur near Ludhiana. Shahpur kandi fort, Ranjit Sagar lake and Sikh Temple in Sri Muktsar Sahib are also popular attractions in Punjab. Punjab also has the world's first museum based on the Indian Partition of 1947, in Amritsar, called the Partition Museum. Fatehgarh Sahib is a town and a sacred pilgrimage site of Sikhism in the north west Indian state of Punjab.[1][2] It is the headquarters of Fatehgarh Sahib district, located about 5 kilometres (3.1 mi) north of Sirhind. Fatehgarh Sahib is named after Fateh Singh, the 6-year-old son of Guru Gobind Singh, who was seized and buried alive, along with his 9-year-old brother Zoravar Singh, by the Mughals under the orders of governor Wazir Khan during the ongoing Mughal-Sikh wars of the early 18th century.[1][2] The town experienced major historical events after the martyrdom of the sons in 1705, with frequent changes of control between the Sikhs and Mughals. Every year nearly 1 million devotees come and pay their homage at fatehgarh sahib gurudwara

Banking
Punjab National Bank 
Punjab & Sind Bank
ਪੰਜਾਬ ਗ੍ਰਾਮੀਣ ਬੈਂਕ

Music

Film

Transportation and infrastructure
Punjab has a relatively well-developed infrastructure,  including road, rail, air and river transport links that are extensive throughout the region.
Its road, rail, air and transport system is rated one of the best in the country with ranking of 210 points compared to the national average of 100 in NCAER's infrastructure index. It has highest per capita generation of electricity in India, at 2.5 times the national average. All of Punjab's villages have been electrified and connected to the state electrical power grid since 1974. In addition to it, the State has nearly *100 percent electrification and nearly 100 percent potable water facility to the population of the State.

Road

All the cities and towns of Punjab are connected by four-lane national highways. The Grand Trunk Road, also known as "NH1", connects Kolkata to Peshawar, passing through Amritsar and Jalandhar. 
National highways passing through the state are ranked the best in the country with widespread road networks that serve isolated towns as well as the border region. Amritsar and Ludhiana are among several Indian cities that have the highest accident rates in India.

The following expressways will pass through Punjab:
 Delhi-Amritsar-Katra Expressway from Delhi to Amritsar and Katra
 Amritsar-Jamnagar Expressway from Amritsar to Jamnagar
 Pathankot-Ajmer Expressway from Pathankot to Ajmer

The following national highways connect major towns, cities and villages:
 National Highway 1
 National Highway 10
 National Highway 15
 National Highway 1A
 National Highway 54
 National Highway 20
 National Highway 21
 National Highway 22
 National Highway 64
 National Highway 70
 National Highway 71
 National Highway 95

Statistics of overall road system:
Total road network  47,605 km
All cities connected by National Highways.
All major towns of adjoining states connected by National Highways.
Percentage of villages connected by metalled roads 97%
National highways:  1000 km
State highways: 2166 km
Major district roads: 1799 km
Other district roads: 3340 km
Link roads: 31657 km

Source: NCAER & Punjab Government.

Bus 
There are also a bus rapid transit system Amritsar BRTS in the holy city of Amritsar, popularly known as 'Amritsar MetroBus'

Air

Punjab has six civil airports including two international airports: Amritsar International Airport and Chandigarh International Airport; and four domestic airports: Bathinda Airport, Pathankot Airport, Adampur Airport (Jalandhar) and Sahnewal Airport (Ludhiana). Apart from these 6 airports, there are 2 airfields at Beas (Amritsar) and Patiala which do not serve any commercial flight operations, as of now.

Sri Guru Ram Dass Jee International Airport in Amritsar, is the Primary Hub Airport and Gateway to Punjab, as the airport serves direct connectivity to key cities around the world, including London, Singapore, Moscow, Dubai, Birmingham among others.

Rail

The Indian Railways' Northern Railway line runs through the state connecting most of the major towns and cities.  The Shatabdi Express, India's fastest series of train connects Amritsar to New Delhi covering total distance of 449 km. Amritsar Junction Railway Station is the busiest junction of the state. Bathinda Junction holds the record of maximum railway lines from a railway junction in Asia. Punjab's major railway stations are 
Amritsar Junction(ASR), Ludhiana Junction (LDH), Jalandhar Cantonment (JRC), Firozpur Cantonment (FZR), Jalandhar City Junction (JUC), Pathankot Junction (PTK) and Patiala railway station (PTA). The railway stations of Amritsar is included in the Indian Railways list of 50 world-class railway stations.

Hyperloop
Punjab Government has signed a Memorendum of Understand(MoU) with Virgin Hyperloop One to explore the feasibility of running a hyperloop between Amritsar and Chandigarh which could decrease the distance between 2 cities from five hours by road to less than 30 minutes. It will have stops in Ludhiana and Jalandhar.

Power 

Total energy of the state is provided by the PSPCL own Thermal Plants 
a) 1260MW GURU GOBIND SINGH SUPER THERMAL PLANT at Ropar,  
c) 920MW Guru Hargobind Thermal Plant at Lehra Mohabbat and its own Hydro Power Plants 
i) 110MW Shanan Power house at Joginder Nagar, 
ii) 600MW Ranjit Sagar DAM at Shah Pur Kandi, 
iii) 91.35MW UBDC power houses, 
iV) 207MW Mukerian Hydel Project, 
v) 134MW Anand Pur Sahib Hydel Channel, 
vi) Mini and Micro Hydro Power Plants on Sirhind Canal.

In addition to that it gets its share from Yhdro Power Plants under the control of BBMB. 
a) 1325MW Bhakra Dam Left and Right Bank Power Houses 
b) 155MW Hydro Power Plants on Bhakra Main Line at Ganguwal and Kotla, 
c) 396MW Hydro Power Plant at Pong, d)990MW Power Plant at Dehar. 
A new Thermal plant is set up in Rajpura(Punjab) with 1400 megawatt of power capacity inaugurated on 8 December 2013. Another Thermal Plant in Bathinda with capacity of 1980 Megawatt power is in planning.

The common pool projects are the Bhakra Nangal Complex, the Dehar Power Plant and the Pong Power Plant. Punjab shares about 51% of the Power generated from the Bhakra Nangal Complex. 48% from the Power generated at the Pong Project.

Common pool projects 
 Bhakra Nangal Complex
 The Upper Bari Doab Canal System (UBDC)
 The Shanah Power House

Thermal electricity 

 Guru Nanak Dev Thermal Plant, Bathinda was completed in 1974. The Guru Nanak Thermal plant had four units of 110X4 MW capacity and was shutdown in 2018.
 Ropar thermal power plant consists of 4 units capable of generating 210 MW each. Two units of this plant have been shutdown in 2018. The plant is spread over an area of about 2,500 acres (10 km²) on the banks of River Sutlej.
 A 1980 MW thermal plant is under execution at Talwandi Sabo in Mansa District by Sterlite industries.
 A 540 MW thermal plant is under implementation at Goindwal Sahib in District Amritsar by GVK Power.
 A 2640 MW thermal plant at Gidderbaha and a 2100 MW Thermal Plant at Rajpura are in the pipeline.
 A number of bio-mass and AGro-Waste based power plants are under construction by Private Companies in collaboration with PEDA based on renewable energy.

Education

Primary and Secondary education is mainly affiliated to Punjab School Education Board. Punjab is served by several institutions of higher education, including 23 universities that provide undergraduate and postgraduate courses in all the major arts, humanities, science, engineering, law, medicine, veterinary science, and business. Reading and writing Punjabi language is compulsory till matriculation for every student failing which the schools attract fine or cancellation of licence.

Punjab Agricultural University is a leading institution globally for the study of agriculture and played a significant role in Punjab's Green Revolution in the 1960s–70s. Alumni of the Panjab University, Chandigarh include Manmohan Singh, the former Prime Minister of India, and Dr. Har Gobind Khorana, a biochemistry nobel laureate. One of the oldest institutions of medical education is the Christian Medical College, Ludhiana, which has existed since 1894. There is an existing gap in education between men and women, particularly in rural areas of Punjab. Of a total of 1 million 300 thousand students enrolled in grades five to eight, only 44% are women.

Punjab has 23 universities, of which ten are private, 9 are state, one is central and three are deemed universities. Punjab has 104,000 (104,000) engineering seats.

Punjab also putting step in education of Yoga and Naturopathy. It's slowly becoming popular and student adopting these as their career . Board of Naturopathy and yoga science (B.N.Y.S.) Regional College Dinanagar is the very first college opened in Dinanagar Town.

See also
Economic and Statistical Organisation Punjab (ESO)

References

Sources